Hargicourt—Pierrepont station (French: Gare de Hargicourt—Pierrepont) is a railway station located in the commune of Trois-Rivières, near the villages Hargicourt and Pierrepont-sur-Avre, in the Somme department, France.  The station is served by TER Hauts-de-France trains (Amiens-Compiègne line).

The station
The station is now an unmanned halt. In 2003 the station was moved 200 m south as part of renovations to make it accessible to the handicapped, and the former station building was closed.

See also
List of SNCF stations in Hauts-de-France

References

Railway stations in Somme (department)
Railway stations in France opened in 1883